Agona District is a former district that was located in Central Region, Ghana. Originally created as an ordinary district assembly in 1988. However on 29 February 2008, it was split off into two new districts: Agona West District (which was elevated to municipal district assembly status on that same year; capital: Agona Swedru) and Agona East District (capital: Nsaba). The district assembly was located in the northeast part of Central Region and had Agona Swedru as its capital town.

Sources
 
 District: Agona District

References

Central Region (Ghana)

Districts of the Central Region (Ghana)

Former districts of Ghana

States and territories established in 1988

States and territories disestablished in 2008

1988 establishments in Ghana

2008 disestablishments in Africa